Broth of a Boy is a 1959 Irish comedy film directed by George Pollock and starring Barry Fitzgerald, Harry Brogan and June Thorburn. It is an adaptation of the 1956 play The Big Birthday by Hugh Leonard.

The film involves the efforts of a British television producer to create a documentary about the birthday of an Irish supercentenarian, but the cantankerous old man is unwilling to cooperate with him.

Plot
Whilst holidaying in Ireland, British TV producer Randall (Tony Wright) comes across a village celebrating the birthday of the oldest man in the world, Patrick Farrell (Barry Fitzgerald). Thinking Farrell's 110th birthday would make an ideal subject for a BBC documentary, Randall seeks to persuade him to agree to being filmed. However, Farrell proves difficult, is an old codger, cantankerous and disreputable, and will cooperate only if he can exploit the situation for his own ends.

Cast
 Barry Fitzgerald ...  Patrick Farrell
 Harry Brogan ...  Willie
 Tony Wright ...  Randall
 June Thorburn ...  Silin Lehane
 Eddie Golden ...  Martin Lehane
 Maire Keane ...  Molly Lehane
 Godfrey Quigley ...  Desmond Phillips
 Bart Bastable ...  Clooney
 Dermot Kelly ...  Tim
 Cecil Barror ...  O'Shaughnessy
 Josephine Fitzgerald ...  Mrs. O'Shaughnessy
 Philip O'Flynn ...  Father Carey
 Dennis Brennan ...  Bolger
 Bill Foley ...  Connolly 
 Annie D'Alton ... Miss. O'Toole
 T. P. McKenna ... Minor role
 Paul Farrell ...  Barman
 Christopher Casson ... Judge

Critical reception
The New York Times wrote, "Although the idea bristles with lively possibilities and Mr. Fitzgerald and the Abbey Theatre players who surround him do as much as they can with it, "Broth of a Boy" only generates mild chuckles and a guffaw or two"; and TV Guide bemoaned the "Bad script, acting, and direction"; whereas Allmovie applauded "a pleasant, easygoing satire of exploitive journalism--a target that is as viable today as it was in 1959"; and Leonard Maltin also found the film "quietly effective."

References

External links

1959 films
1959 comedy films
Irish comedy films
1950s English-language films
English-language Irish films
Films directed by George Pollock
Films with screenplays by Patrick Kirwan
Irish films based on plays
Films set in Ireland
Films about birthdays
Films about old age
Films about television people